Laurie Rose may refer to:

 Laurie Rose, an American actress better known as Misty Dawn
 Laurie Rose (cinematographer), an English cinematographer